Julién Raymond Davenport (born January 9, 1995) is an American football offensive tackle for the Arizona Cardinals of the National Football League (NFL). He played college football at Bucknell and was drafted by the Houston Texans in the fourth round of the 2017 NFL Draft. Davenport also previously played for the Miami Dolphins, Indianapolis Colts, and Chicago Bears.

Professional career

Houston Texans
The Houston Texans selected Davenport in the fourth round (130th overall) of the 2017 NFL Draft. On May 12, 2017, the Texans signed Davenport to a four-year, $2.98 million contract that included a signing bonus of $586,415. He played in 11 games with four starts as a rookie.

In 2018, Davenport started 15 games, 13 at left tackle and two at right tackle.

Miami Dolphins
On August 31, 2019, Davenport, Johnson Bademosi, 2020 and 2021 first round picks, and a 2021 second-round pick were traded to the Miami Dolphins in exchange for Laremy Tunsil, his teammate Kenny Stills, a 2020 fourth-round pick and 2021 sixth round pick. On September 12, 2019, Davenport suffered a hyperextended knee and a cracked fibula during practice and was placed on injured reserve the following day. He was designated for return from injured reserve on October 31, 2019, and began practicing with the team again. He was activated off injured reserve on November 16, 2019.

Indianapolis Colts
On March 29, 2021, Davenport signed with the Indianapolis Colts.

Chicago Bears
On April 25, 2022, Davenport signed with the Chicago Bears. He was released on August 23, 2022.

Arizona Cardinals
On November 16, 2022, Davenport was signed to the Arizona Cardinals practice squad. He signed a reserve/future contract on January 11, 2023.

References

External links
Bucknell Bison bio
Houston Texans bio

1995 births
Living people
Paulsboro High School alumni
People from Paulsboro, New Jersey
Players of American football from New Jersey
Sportspeople from Gloucester County, New Jersey
American football offensive tackles
Bucknell Bison football players
Chicago Bears players
Houston Texans players
Miami Dolphins players
Indianapolis Colts players
Arizona Cardinals players